Basantkumar John Oommen (born 8 September 1953 in Conoor, India) is an Indian-Canadian computer scientist.  Oommen received the Master of Science degree from the Indian Institute of Science, Bangalore in 1979, and the Doctor of Philosophy degree from Purdue University in 1982, and is now Chancellor's Professor at the School of Computer Science, Carleton University.

Recognition and awards 
Fellow of the IAPR, August 2006
Chancellor's Professorship, lifetime award bestowed by the University to professors who have excelled in research, July 2006
Fellow of the IEEE, January 2003
Electrical Engineering Gold Medal Winner 1977, Indian Institute of Science, Bangalore, for best graduating student
Siemens-India Meda 1975, Indian Institute of Technology, Madras, for best graduating student from the Department of Electrical Engineering
Kaloori Medal 1974, IIT Madras

Patents
A Method of Generating Attribute Cardinality Maps
A Method for Recognizing Trees by Processing Potentially Noisy Subsequence Trees
A Method for Encryption with Statistical Perfect Secrecy
Search-Enhanced Trie-Based Syntactic Pattern Recognition of Sequences

References

External links 
Web page of B. John Oommen at School of Computer Science, Carleton University
John Oommen's list of publications

1953 births
20th-century Indian mathematicians
Living people
Fellow Members of the IEEE
Indian Institute of Science alumni
Scientists from Tamil Nadu
People from Coonoor
Fellows of the International Association for Pattern Recognition